Giorgio Berti (1794–1863)  was an Italian painter, active in Neoclassic style.

Biography
He was born in Florence, and there a pupil at the Academy of Fine Arts under Benvenuti. Among his works were a painting of 
Herminia reveals her Beauty to the Shepherds (1821) from an episode of Jerusalem Delivered; painting of Ste Felicita witnesses the Martyrdom of her seven sons (after 1824) for church of Santa Felicita, and a Charity of San Camillo de Lellis for Santa Maria Maggiore.

References

1794 births
1863 deaths
18th-century Italian painters
Italian male painters
19th-century Italian painters
Italian neoclassical painters
Painters from Florence
Accademia di Belle Arti di Firenze alumni
19th-century Italian male artists
18th-century Italian male artists